The Nelson Range is a mountain range in the "Northern Mojave-Mono Lake region" of Inyo County, California, in Death Valley National Park.

Geography
The range is located on the western side of Death Valley, framing the west side of the Racetrack Playa with the Cottonwood Mountains to the east. 

On the west of the Nelson Range is the Saline Valley, and the Panamint Range is to the south.

References

See also
Category: Mountain ranges of the Mojave Desert
Category: Protected areas of the Mojave Desert

Death Valley
Mountain ranges of Inyo County, California
Mountain ranges of the Mojave Desert
Protected areas of the Mojave Desert